Catilina Aubameyang (born 1 September 1983) is a Gabonese former professional footballer who played as a left-winger. He spent most of his career in the lower divisions of France and Italy. At international level, he made nine appearances scoring one goal for the Gabon national team between 2004 and 2010. He is the half-brother of footballer Pierre-Emerick Aubameyang.

Club career
Aubameyang was born in Libreville, Gabon. He started his European career at Reggiana, and then transferred to AC Milan in 2000. In the 2001–02 season, Aubameyang made one appearance in the UEFA Cup, against BATE Borisov. In the 2002–03 season, he made one appearance in UEFA Champions League, against Deportivo La Coruña. He also made one appearance in Serie A as a starter in a 4–2 loss to Piacenza Calcio.

Aubameyang was then loaned to various teams, and went back to Gabon with 105 Libreville in the summer of 2006. In January 2007, he signed for Championnat National club Paris FC. At the beginning of the 2007–08 season, Aubameyang joined Ajaccio. From 2013 until his retirement in 2017, he played in lower divisions in Lombardy, Italy.

International career
Born in Gabon, Aubameyang played once for the France under-19s. He earned nine caps for the Gabon national team, scoring one goal.

Personal life
Catilina is the son of former Gabonese international Pierre Aubameyang. He is the elder brother of Willy Aubameyang and the half-brother of Pierre-Emerick Aubameyang. Through his father, Catilina also has a French passport that enabled him to play for France's youth team.

Career statistics
Score and result list Gabon's goal tally first, score column indicates score after Aubameyang goal.

References

1983 births
Living people
Sportspeople from Libreville
Association football midfielders
Gabonese footballers
Gabon international footballers
French footballers
France youth international footballers
Serie A players
Serie B players
A.C. Reggiana 1919 players
A.C. Milan players
Rimini F.C. 1912 players
A.C. Ancona players
Paris FC players
AC Ajaccio players
U.S. Triestina Calcio 1918 players
FC Lugano players
FC Chiasso players
Gazélec Ajaccio players
Sapins FC players
Gabonese expatriate footballers
Expatriate footballers in Italy
Expatriate footballers in Switzerland
French sportspeople of Gabonese descent
Gabonese expatriate sportspeople in France
Gabonese expatriate sportspeople in Italy
Gabonese expatriate sportspeople in Switzerland
Black French sportspeople